Thomas Peter Lewis (born 7 March 1991) is an English cricketer who plays for Warwickshire. Primarily a left-handed batsman, he also bowls right-arm medium. He made his  Twenty20 debut for Warwickshire (known as the Birmingham Bears in Twenty20 cricket) against Nottinghamshire in May 2015. His brother, Mark, played first-class cricket.

External links
 Tom Lewis at ESPN Cricinfo

1991 births
Living people
English cricketers
Cricketers from Coventry
Warwickshire cricketers